Murder, Inc. was an organized crime group in the 1940s.

Murder, Inc. may also refer to:

Aircraft
 Murder Inc., a notable B-17 bomber during World War II

Films
 Murder, Inc. (1951 film), British title of 1951 film The Enforcer
 Murder, Inc. (1960 film), American gangster film directed by Burt Balaban and Stuart Rosenberg

Literature
 Murder, Inc.: The Story of the Syndicate, a 1951 book by Burton Turkus and Sid Feder chronicling Murder, Inc.
Murder Inc., Las Vegas, a novel

Music
 Murder, Inc. (band), industrial music supergroup formed in 1991
 Murder, Inc. (album), their only studio album
 Murder Inc. (rap group), American hip hop supergroup formed by Irv Gotti in 1995
 Murder Inc. Records, music-recording label
 "Murder Incorporated", song by Bruce Springsteen on Greatest Hits